The October Revolution, or "Red October", was a revolution in Russia led by the Bolsheviks in 1917.

October Revolution may also refer to:

Political events 

 Xinhai Revolution in China of October 1911, sometimes called the October Revolution
 Polish October anti-Stalinist protests and riots of 1956
 The overthrow of Juan Federico Ponce Vaides and the beginning of the Guatemalan Revolution in 1944
 October 1964 Revolution in Sudan
 Peaceful Revolution in East Germany and the decisive events of October–November 1989
 Vienna Uprising or October Revolution of 1848
 Overthrow of Slobodan Milošević ("5 October Overthrow") in 2000 in Belgrade, Federal Republic of Yugoslavia
 October Rebellion, a series of protests surrounding the 2007 World Bank meetings in Washington D.C., U.S.
 Revolution of 1934, or Revolution of October 1934, a series of revolutionary strikes in Spain
 2019–2021 Lebanese protests, a series of civil protests in Lebanon that began in October 2019 and is still ongoing
 1993 Russian constitutional crisis, stand-off in Moscow between the Russian president Boris Yeltsin and the Russian parliament

Other uses

 October Revolution Island, an island in the Russian Arctic, named after the Russian October Revolution
 Russian battleship Gangut (1911), recommissioned in 1925 as Oktyabrskaya Revolutsiya 
 "October Revolution in Jazz" a 1964 music festival

See also
October Crisis (disambiguation)